Farrell Treacy (born 29 April 1995) is a British short track speed skater. He competed in the 2018 Winter Olympics and 2022 Winter Olympics.

References

1995 births
Living people
British male short track speed skaters
Olympic short track speed skaters of Great Britain
Short track speed skaters at the 2018 Winter Olympics
Short track speed skaters at the 2022 Winter Olympics